Kockelmans is a surname. Notable people with the surname include:

Gerard Kockelmans (1925–1965), Dutch composer, conductor, and music teacher
Hans Kockelmans (born 1956), Dutch composer, teacher, and performer

See also
Kockelman, another surname

Dutch-language surnames